The name Bopha has been used to name three tropical cyclones in the western north Pacific The name was submitted by Cambodia and is a flower and girl's name.

 Tropical Storm Bopha (2000) (T0015, 24W, Ningning) – An erratically moving system that eventually affected the Philippines.
 Severe Tropical Storm Bopha (2006) (T0609, 10W, Inday) – Caused minor impact on Taiwan.
 Typhoon Bopha (2012) (T1224, 26W, Pablo) – A very powerful late-season tropical cyclone which formed unusually close to the equator.

The name Bopha was retired by the WMO following the 2013 typhoon season and was replaced by Ampil in the 2018 season.

Pacific typhoon set index articles